The first Christmas Day plot was a conspiracy made by the Indian revolutionary movement in 1909: during the year-ending holidays, the Governor of Bengal organised at his residence a ball in the presence of the Viceroy, the Commander-in-Chief and all the high-ranking officers and officials of the Capital (Calcutta). The 10th Jat Regiment was in charge of the security. Indoctrinated by Jatindranath Mukherjee, its soldiers decided to blow up the ballroom and take advantage of destroying the colonial Government. In keeping with his predecessor Otto (William Oskarovich) von Klemm, a friend of Lokamanya Tilak, on 6 February 1910, M. Arsenyev, the Russian Consul-General, wrote to St Petersburg that it had been intended to "arouse in the country a general perturbation of minds and, thereby, afford the revolutionaries an opportunity to take the power in their hands." According to R. C. Majumdar, "The police had suspected nothing and it is hard to say what the outcome would have been had the soldiers not been betrayed by one of their comrades who informed the authorities about the impending coup".

The second Christmas Day plot was to initiate an insurrection in Bengal in British India during World War I with German arms and support. Scheduled for Christmas Day, 1915, the plan was conceived and led by the Jugantar group under the Indian Bengali revolutionary Jatindranath Mukherjee, to be coordinated with simultaneous uprising in the British colony of Burma and Kingdom of Siam under direction of the Ghadar Party, along with a German raid on the South Indian city of Madras and the British penal colony in Andaman Islands. The aim of the plot was to seize the Fort William, isolate Bengal and capture the capital city of Calcutta, which was then to be used as a staging ground for a pan-Indian revolution. The Christmas Day plot was one of the later plans for pan-Indian mutiny during the war that were coordinated between the Indian nationalist underground, the "Indian independence committee" set up by the Germans in Berlin, the Ghadar Party in North America, and the German Foreign office. The plot was ultimately thwarted after British intelligence uncovered the plot through German and Indian double agents in Europe and Southeast Asia.

Background
The growth of the Indian middle class during the 19th century, amidst competition among regional powers and the ascendancy of the British East India Company, led to a growing sense of "Indian" identity. The refinement of this perspective fed a rising tide of nationalism in India in the last decades of the 19th century. Its speed was abetted by the creation of the Indian National Congress in India in 1885 by A. O. Hume. The Congress developed into a major platform for the demands of political liberalisation, increased autonomy and social reform. However, the nationalist movement became particularly strong, radical and violent in Bengal and, later, in Punjab. Notable, if smaller, movements also appeared in Maharashtra, Madras and other areas in the South. Political terrorism began taking an organised form in Bengal at the beginning of the 20th century. By 1902, Calcutta had three societies working under the umbrella of Anushilan Samiti, a society earlier founded by a Calcutta barrister by the name of Pramatha Mitra. These included Mitra's own group, another led by a Bengalee lady by the name of Sarala Devi, and a third one led by Aurobindo Ghosh, one of the strongest proponents of militant nationalism of the time. By 1905, the works of Aurobindo and his brother Barin Ghosh allowed Anushilan Samity to spread through Bengal. The controversial 1905 partition of Bengal had a widespread political impact: it stimulated radical nationalist sentiments in the Bhadralok community in Bengal, and helped Anushilan acquire a support base amongst of educated, politically conscious and disaffected young in local youth societies of Bengal. The Dhaka branch of Anushilan was led by Pulin Behari Das and spread branches through East Bengal and Assam. Aurobindo and Bipin Chandra Pal, a Bengali politician, began in 1907 the radical Bengali nationalist publication of Jugantar ("Change"), and its English counterpart Bande Mataram. Among the early recruits who emerged noted leaders were Rash Behari Bose, Jatindranath Mukherjee, and Jadugopal Mukherjee.

Anushilan, notably from early on, established links with foreign movements and Indian nationalism abroad. In 1907, Barin Ghosh arranged to send to Paris one of his associates by the name of Hem Chandra Kanungo (Hem Chandra Das), he was to learn the art of bomb-making from Nicholas Safranski, a Russian revolutionary in exile in the French Capital. Paris was also home at the time Madam Cama who was amongst the leading figures of the Paris Indian Society and the India House in London. The bomb manual later found its way through V. D. Savarkar to the press at India House for mass printing. In the meantime, in December 1907 the Bengal revolutionary cell derailed the train carrying the Bengal Lieutenant Governor Sir Andrew Fraser. Anushilan also engaged at this time in a number of notable incidences of political assassinations and dacoities to obtain funds. This was, however, the crest for Anushilan. In 1908, two young recruits, Khudiram Bose and Prafulla Chaki were sent on a mission to Muzaffarpur to assassinate the Chief Presidency Magistrate D.H. Kingsford. The duo bombed a carriage they mistook as Kingsford's, killing two English women in it. In the aftermath of the murder, Khudiram Bose was arrested while attempting to flee, while Chaki took his own life. Narendra Nath Bhattacharya, then a member of the group, shot dead Nandalal Bannerjee, the officer who had arrested Khudiram. Police investigations into the murders revealed the organisations quarters in Maniktala suburb of Calcutta and led to a number of arrests, opening the famous Alipore Conspiracy trial. Some of its leadership were executed or incarcerated, while others went underground. Aurobindo Ghosh himself retired from active politics after serving a prison sentence, his brother Barin was imprisoned for life.

Jatindra Nath Mukherjee escaped arrest in the Alipore case, and took over the leadership of the secret society, to be known as the Jugantar Party. He revitalised the links between the central organisation in Calcutta and its several branches spread all over Bengal, Bihar, Orissa and several places in Uttar Pradesh, and opened hideouts in the Sundarbans for members who had gone underground The group slowly reorganised guided Mukherjee's efforts of aided by an emerging leadership which included Amarendra Chatterjee, Naren Bhattacharya and other younger leaders. Some of its younger members including Tarak Nath Das left India, to prepare scopes abroad. Through the next two years, the organisation operated under the covers of two seemingly detached organisations, Sramajeebi Samabaya (The Labourer's Cooperative) and Harry & Sons. Since 1906, Jatin Mukherjee had been attempting to establish contacts with the 10th Jat Regiment then garrisoned at Fort William in Calcutta. Narendra Nath carried out through this time a number of robberies to obtain funds. In the meantime, however, a second blow came in 1910 when Shamsul Alam, a Bengal Police officer then preparing a conspiracy case against the group, was assassinated by an associate of Jatin Mukherjee by the name of Biren Dutta Gupta. The assassination led to the arrests which ultimately precipitated the Howrah-Sibpur Conspiracy Case.

Pre-war developments
While incarcerated during the Howrah-Sibpur conspiracy trial, a nucleus emerged within the party comprising the most militant of the nationalists. These developed from early ideas initially mooted by Barin Ghosh. This nucleus foresaw the possibilities of an Anglo-German war in the near-future, and around this the revolutionaries intended to launch a guerilla war with assistance from Germany. The trial brought to attention the direction the group headed, moving away from the efforts of the early revolutionaries which aimed to merely terrorise the British administration. The nucleus that arose during the trial held deeper political motives and aspirations, and built on this nucleus to develop an organisational network throughout Bengal and other parts of India.

The Howrah conspirators were released after about a year when the Howrah-Sibpur case collapsed due to lack of evidence. Released in February 1911, Jatin Mukherjee suspended all overtly violent activities. Suspended from his government job, Jatin began a business, working as a contractor for the railway network in Bengal, a job which allowed him to roam the Bengal countryside identifying suitable spots for the revolutionary projects he was planning. In 1906, an early Anushilan member Jatindranath Banerjee (known as Niralamba Swami) had left Bengal in the guise of a Sanyasi, making his way to the United Provinces and subsequently Punjab. At Punjab, Niralamba established links with Sardar Ajit Singh and Bhai Kishen Singh (father of Bhagat Singh). Through Kishen Singh, the Bengal revolutionary cell was introduced to Lala Har Dayal when the latter visited India briefly in 1908. Har Dayal himself was associated with the India House, a revolutionary organisation in London then under V. D. Savarkar; Dayal was proud that by 1910, he had worked closely with Rash Behari Bose. Bose was a Jugantar member employed at the Forest institute at Dehradun, who worked, possibly independent of Jatin Mukherjee, on the revolutionary movement in UP and Punjab since October 1910. The India House itself was liquidated in 1910 in the aftermath of Sir W. H. Curzon Wyllie's assassination in the hands of Madanlal Dhingra, a member of the London group. Among the India House group who fled Britain was V. N. Chetterjee, who left for Germany. Har Dayal himself moved to San Francisco after working briefly with the Paris Indian Society. In the United States, nationalism among Indian immigrants, particularly students and working classes, was gaining ground. Tarak Nath Das, who had left Bengal for the United States in 1907, was among the noted Indian leaders who engaged in political work, maintaining contact with Sri Aurobindo and Jatin Mukherjee. In California, Har Dayal's arrival bridged a gap between the intellectual agitators in the west coast and the lower classes in the Pacific coast. Welcomed by Taranath Das, he emerged a leading organiser of Indian nationalism amongst the predominantly immigrant labour workers from India, founding the Ghadar movement.

Meanwhile, in 1912, Jatin met in the company of Naren Bhattacharya the Crown Prince of Germany during the latter's visit to Calcutta in 1912, and obtained an assurance that arms and ammunition would be supplied to them. The October of the same year, Rash Behari visited Lahore, rallying Har Dayal's group and beginning a campaign of revolutionary violence marked most dramatically by an attempt on the Viceroy, Lord Hardinge in December 1912.  Rash Behari's associate Basanta Biswas – sent by Amarendra Chatterjee, had belonged to Jatin Mukherjee's circle of followers.  Niralamba Swami informed Jatin Mukherjee further about the activities in North India when they met, on a pilgrimage to the holy Hindu city of Brindavan. Returning to Bengal, in 1913, Jatin began organising a grand scale relief in the flood-stricken areas around the Damodar. Rash Behari had gone into hiding in Benares after the 1912 attempt on Hardinge, but he joined Jatin Mukherjee on this occasion. Acknowledging in Jatin Mukherjee the true leader of the people, Bose met him several times towards the end of 1913, outlining the prospects of a pan-Indian revolution of 1857 style.

World War I

In response to Britain's entry to the war on the side of France, Germany had begun actively considering efforts to weaken the British war efforts by targeting her colonial empire. Germany nurtured links with India nationalists before the war, seeing India as a potential weakness for Britain. In the immediate period preceding the war, Indian nationalist groups had used Germany as a base and potential support. As early as 1913, revolutionary literature referred to the approaching war between Germany and England and the possibility of obtaining German help for the Indian movement. In the early months of the war, German newspapers also devoted considerable coverage to Indian distress, social problems, and colonial exploitation by Britain. The Indian situation featured in the German war strategy. The German Chancellor Theobald von Bethmann Hollweg finally authorised German activity against India in the early weeks of the war, and decision was taken to offer active support to the Indian Nationalists. Through the newly formed Intelligence Bureau for the East, headed by prominent archaeologist and historian Max von Oppenheim, Germany contemplated plans for nationalist unrest in India. Oppenheim helped the formation of the Berlin Committee formed by C. R. Pillai. Among the members of this group was V. N. Chatterjee of London India House. Har Dayal himself had fled the United States for Switzerland after he was arrested on the charge of being an anarchist. He left the Ghadar party in charge of Ram Chandra Bharadwaj, and from Switzerland, he agreed to support the Berlin Committee. Through Indian emissaries and through staff of the German consulate at San Francisco, contacts were established with the Ghadar Party. Germany offered to aid in finances, arms, and military advisors to plans considered between the German foreign office, Berlin Committee, and the Indian Ghadar Party in North America to clandestinely ship arms and men to India from United States and the Orient with which they hoped to trigger a nationalist mutiny in India in 1914–15, on the lines of the 1857 uprising.

At the time the war broke out, Jugantar, in a convened meeting, elected Jatin Mukherjee the supreme commander. The German consulate in Calcutta was at this time able to establish contacts with Jatin who, encouraged by Sir Ashutosh, had met D. Thibault, the Registrar of Calcutta University. The Consul General reported back to Berlin that the Bengal revolutionary cell was significant enough to be considered for active support in undermining the British war effort. Jugantar began a campaign of politically motivated armed robberies to obtain funds and arms in August. On 26 August, the Calcutta store of Rodda & co, one of the biggest arms stores in Calcutta, was looted. The raiders made off with ten cases of arms and ammunition, including 50 Mauser Pistols and 46,000 rounds of ammunition.

Ghadar
Jatin's cousin Dhan Gopal Mukerji, then a student at UC Berkeley, had already been in the United States for some time. In 1914, Jatin sent to San Francisco a party member by the name of Satyendra Sen with the purpose of contacting the Ghadar party. Sen returned in November 1914, with information on the plans being implemented by the Berlin Committee headed by Virendranath Chattopadhyaya and the German military attaché Franz von Papen at Washington, to purchase a huge consignment arms to be sent to India by sea. $200,000 worth of small arms and ammunition had been earlier acquired by him through Krupp agents, and arranged for its shipment to India through San Diego, Java, and Burma. The arsenal included 8,080 Springfield rifles of Spanish–American War vintage, 2,400 Springfield carbines, 410 Hotchkiss repeating rifles, 4,000,000 cartridges, 500 Colt revolvers with 100,000 cartridges, and 250 Mauser pistols along with ammunition. Sen had also introduced to Jatin a Ghadarite leader, Kartar Singh Sarabha, who had returned to India to co-ordinate the plans for the proposed revolt with the Indian underground. Ghadarites, most of them Indian expatriates from Punjab, were pouring into India via Calcutta, tasked to mobilise Sepoys of the Indian army, preparing for mutiny in the army centres in the North Indian region of Punjab. The Commander-in-Chief Jatin Mukherjee was to co-ordinate with this to draw on the Indian army in the east, in Bengal. The plot in Upper India was being coordinated by Rash Behari from United Provinces, and was ably supported by Vishnu Ganesh Pingle, another Ghadarite who too returned to India in November 1914 from the United States, and by Sachindra Nath Sanyal (of the Dhaka Anusilan Samiti) who worked from Benares. Bose coordinated with Jatin, and the latter himself was to lead Bengal into mutiny. The mutiny was scheduled for late February 1915, beginning with Indian army units in Punjab, followed by units in Bengal. The Bengal cell was to look for the Punjab Mail entering the Howrah Station the next day (which would have been cancelled if Punjab was seized) and was to strike immediately. Units as far as Rangoon and Singapore were part of the Rash Behari's plan.

However, Rash Behari's plans for mutiny failed when, in February 1915, in a situation simmering in Punjab, Ghadar rose prematurely even before Papen had arranged to ship his arsenal. Set for 21 February 1915, details of the date and places found their way to Punjab CID through a spy, Kirpal Singh, recruited at the last minute. Sensing infiltration, a desperate Rash Behari brought forward the D-Day to the 19th, but incautiousness allowed Kirpal to report back to Punjab police in the nick of time. Mutiny in Punjab was crushed on the 19th, followed by suppression of smaller revolts throughout North India. The Singapore garrison managed to revolt openly and held out for some time before it was crushed six days later. Mass arrests followed as the Ghadarites were rounded up in Punjab and the Central Provinces. Key leaders of the conspiracy, including Kartar Singh, Pingle, Kanshi Ram, Bhai Bhagwan Singh and others were arrested. Rash Behari Bose escaped from Lahore and in May 1915 fled to Japan. Other leaders, including Giani Pritam Singh, Swami Satyananda Puri and others fled to Thailand. Jatin Mukherjee and the rest of the Bengal cell went underground.

Autumn 1915
In the aftermath of the failed February mutiny, concerted efforts attempted to destroy the Indian revolutionary movement. Preoccupied by the increasing police activities to prevent any uprising, eminent Jugantar members suggested that Jatin move to a safer place. Balasore on the Orissa coast was selected as a suitable place, being very near the spot where German arms were to be landed for the Indian rising. To facilitate the transmission of information to Jatin Mukherjee, a business house under the name "Universal Emporium" was set up, as a branch of Harry & Sons in Calcutta, created in order to keep contacts with revolutionaries abroad. Jatin, therefore, moved to a hideout outside Kaptipada village in the native state of Mayurbhanj, more than thirty miles away from Balasore. In the meantime, Papen, in Liaison with Chandrakanta Chakrabarti, the self-styled agent of the Berlin Committee in United States, arranged for the first shipment of arms aboard the schooner Annie Larsen under a successful cover set up to lead British agents to believe that the arms were for the warring factions of the Mexican Civil War. Maverick was to sail to Dutch East Indies. Disastrous co-ordination prevented a successful rendezvous off Socorro Island. After waiting for the Maverick for a month, Annie Larsen returned to San Diego to be told to return to the island and wait for the tanker. Maverick, in the meantime, reached the rendezvous a month late, having been held up at port by repair work. Unable to find the schooner, she set sail across the Pacific, hoping to pick up the trail at Hawaii. Annie Larsens second voyage meanwhile failed when she ran into headstrong winds. Returning to Hoquiam, Washington, after a number of failed attempts, the Annie Larsen's cargo was promptly seized by US customs who were intimated by British intelligence. Maverick made across the Pacific for the Dutch East Indies, but her Captain had no way of forewarning the Germans there that she came not with the arms they expected, but only bales of revolutionary literature and a handful of Indian revolutionaries. In April 1915, unaware of the failure of the Annie Larsen plan, Papen arranged, through Krupp's American representative Hans Tauscher, a second shipment of arms, consisting of 7,300 Springfield rifles, 1,930 pistols, 10 Gatling guns and nearly 3,000,000 cartridges. The arms were to be shipped in mid June to Surabaya in the East Indies on the Holland American steamship SS Djember.

Christmas Day plot
German agents in Thailand and Burma included Emil and Theodor Helferrich— brothers of the German Finance minister Karl Helfferich. Through a Jugantar member named Jitendranath Lahiri, the Helferrichs had been able to establish links with Jatin Mukherjee in March 1915. In April Jatin sent to Batavia Jitendra Nath and Narendranath Bhattacharya, the latter by then his chief lieutenant. Through the German Consul, Narendranath met with the Helfferich brothers in Batavia and was informed of the expected arrival of the Maverick with arms. The duo were to guide the Maverick, when she arrived, to the coast of the Bay of Bengal. In April, 1915, following instructions from Chatto passed on through, in order to make a deal with the German authorities concerning financial aid and the supply of arms. Although these were originally intended for Ghadar use, the Berlin Committee modified the plans, to have arms shipped into India to the eastern coast of India, through Hatia on the Chittagong coast, Raimangal in the Sundarbans and Balasore in Orissa, instead of Karachi as had been originally decided. From the coast of the Bay of Bengal, these were to be collected by Jatin's group. For this purpose, Ashwini Lal Roy was sent to Raimangal to receive the maverick. Jugantar also received funds (estimated to be Rs 33,000 between June and August 1915) from The Helfferich brothers through Harry & sons in Calcutta.

Bengal
The date of insurrection was fixed for Christmas Day of 1915. Jatin estimated that he would be able to win over the 14th Rajput Regiment in Calcutta and cut the line to Madras at Balasore and thus take control of Bengal.

Burma
To provide the Bengal group enough time to capture Calcutta and to prevent reinforcements from being rushed in, mutiny was planned for Burma with arms smuggled in from Neutral Thailand. This Siam-Burma plan originated early in October 1914 from the Ghadar Party and was finally concluded in January 1915. Ghadarites from branches in China and United States, including leaders like Atma Ram, Thakar Singh, and Banta Singh from Shanghai and Santokh Singh and Bhagwan Singh from San Francisco, attempted to infiltrate Burma Military Police in Thailand, which was composed mostly of Sikhs and Punjabi Muslims. Early in 1915, Atma Ram had also visited Calcutta and Punjab and linked up with the revolutionary underground there, including Jugantar. Herambalal Gupta and the German consul at Chicago arranged to have German operatives George Paul Boehm, Henry Schult, and Albert Wehde sent to Siam through Manila with the purpose of training the Indians. Santokh Singh returned to Shanghai tasked to send two expeditions, one to reach the Indian border via Yunnan and the other to penetrate upper Burma and join with revolutionary elements there. The Germans, while in Manila, also attempted to transfer the arms cargo of two German ships, the Sachsen and the Suevia, to Siam in a schooner seeking refuge at Manila harbour. However, US customs stopped these attempts. In the meantime, with the help of the German Consul to Thailand Remy, the Ghadarite established a training headquarters in the jungles near the Thai-Burma border for Ghadarites arriving from China and Canada. German Consul General at Shanghai, Knipping, sent three officers of the Peking Embassy Guard for training and in addition arranged for a Norwegian agent in Swatow to smuggle arms through.

Andaman
At the same time that Jatin's group was to strike in Bengal, a German raid was planned for the penal colony in the Andaman islands. This was to be carried out with a German volunteer force raised from East Indies which would release the political prisoners to raise an expeditionary Indian force that would threaten the Indian coast. The plan was proposed by Vincent Kraft, a German planter in Batavia who had been wounded fighting in France. It was approved by the foreign office on 14 May 1915, after consultation with the Indian committee, and raid was planned for Christmas Day 1915 by a force of nearly one hundred Germans led by a former naval officer von Müller was raised. Knipping made plans for shipping arms to the Andaman islands. However, Vincent Kraft was a double agent, and leaked details of Knippings plans to British intelligence. His own bogus plans for the raid were in the meantime revealed to Beckett by "Oren", but given the successive failures of the Indo-German plans, the plans for the operations were abandoned on the recommendations of both the Berlin Committee and Knipping.

Culmination

The Christmas Day plot was ultimately leaked out through a number of sources. The earliest information was received on the details of the cargo being carried by the Maverick and of Jugantar's plans that were leaked to Beckett, the British Consul at Batavia, by a defecting Baltic-German agent under the alias "Oren". The Maverick was seized and alerts were sounded to British Indian police.  Another source was the German double agent Vincent Kraft, a planter from Batavia, who passed information about arms shipments from Shanghai to British agents after being captured. Maps of the Bengal coast were found on Kraft when he was initially arrested and he volunteered the information that these were the intended landing sites for German arms. As soon as the information reached the British authorities, they alerted the police, particularly in the delta region of the Ganges, and sealed off all the sea approaches on the eastern coast from the Noakhali–Chittagong side to Orissa. Harry & Sons was raided and searched, and the police found a clue which led them to Kaptipada village, where Jatin was staying with Manoranjan Sengupta and Chittapriya Ray Chaudhuri; a unit of the Police Intelligence Department was dispatched to Balasore.

Jatin Mukherjee's death
Jatin was kept informed and was requested to leave his hiding place, but his insistence on taking Niren and Jatish with him delayed his departure by a few hours, by which time a large force of police, headed by top European officers from Calcutta and Balasore, reinforced by the army unit from Chandbali in Mayurbhanj State, had reached the neighbourhood. Jatin and his companions walked through the forests and hills of Mayurbhanj, and after two days reached Balasore Railway Station.

The police had announced a reward for the capture of five fleeing "bandits", so the local villagers were also in pursuit. With occasional skirmishes, the revolutionaries, running through jungles and marshy land in torrential rain, finally took up position on 9 September 1915 in an improvised trench in undergrowth on a hillock at Chashakhand in Balasore. Chittapriya and his companions asked Jatin to leave and go to safety while they guarded the rear. Jatin refused to leave them, however.

The contingent of Government forces approached them in a pincer movement. A gunfight ensued, lasting seventy-five minutes, between the five revolutionaries armed with Mauser pistols and the large number of police and army armed with modern rifles. It ended with an unrecorded number of casualties on the Government side; on the revolutionary side, Chittapriya Ray Chaudhuri died, Jatin and Jatish were seriously wounded, and Manoranjan Sengupta and Niren were captured after their ammunition ran out.  Bagha Jatin died, killed by police bullets, in Balasore hospital on 10 September 1915.

Siam Burma plan
In the meantime, the Thai Police high command, which was largely British, discovered the plans for the Burmese insurrection, and Indian police infiltrated the plot through an Indian secret agent who was revealed the details by the Austrian chargé d'affaires.  Thailand, although officially neutral, was allied closely with Britain and British India.  On 21 July, the newly arrived British Minister Herbert Dering presented Foreign Minister Prince Devawongse with the request for arrest and extradition of Ghadarites identified by the Indian agent, ultimately resulting in the arrest of leading Ghadarites in August. Only a single raid into Burma was launched by six Ghadarites, who were captured and later hanged.

Footnotes

References

 

 
 

 

.
 

 

Anushilan Samiti
India in World War I
Hindu–German Conspiracy
Revolutionary movement for Indian independence
British Empire in World War I
1915 in India